Arsène Darmesteter (5 January 1846, Château-Salins, Moselle16 November 1888, Paris) was a distinguished French philologist and man of letters.

Biography
He studied under Gaston Paris at the École pratique des hautes études, and became professor of Old French language and literature at the Sorbonne, where he met his wife, the painter Héléna Hartog. His Life of Words appeared in English in 1888. He also collaborated with Adolphe Hatzfeld in a Dictionnaire général de la langue française (2 vols., 1895-1900). Among his most important work was the elucidation of Old French by means of the many glosses in the medieval writings of Rashi and other French Jews.

His scattered papers on Romance and Jewish philology were collected by James Darmesteter as Arsène Darmesteter, reliques scientifiques (2 vols., 1890). His valuable Cours de grammaire historique de la langue française was edited after his death by E. Muret and L. Sudre (1891-1895; English edition, 1902).

References

1846 births
1888 deaths
People from Moselle (department)
19th-century French Jews
Academic staff of the University of Paris
French philologists
École Nationale des Chartes alumni